Muslim National Students Pakistan (Pakistan Students Movement for khilafat) is a political student's organization in Pakistan founded in 2014 by Syed Mohsin Raza Gillani. It is one of the most rapidly growing political students organization of Pakistan, and has created a 1st Political Students Organization system.

The organization has led the efforts to highlight khilafat movement of the rulers. This effort is spearheaded by chairman Syed Mohsin Raza Gillani.

History
Muslim National Students Pakistan was founded by Syed Mohsin Raza Gillani on 24 February 2014 in Taxila. Founded initially as a khilafat movement, in July 2014 the first Central Executive Committee of Muslim National Students Pakistan of was formed under the leadership of Syed Mohsin Raza Gillani, it began to grow slowly but did not achieve immediate popularity. Syed Mohsin Raza Gillani launched it as a political students organization which he claimed represented the true aspirations of the people of Pakistan.

Ideology
Muslim National Students's agenda envisions an Islamic republic that advocates individuals' welfare through community co-operation. It wants to set Pakistan on a course to khilafat.

The organization has an agenda to blend Khilafat and religious values and cultural a of Pakistan into common goals and aspirations for a just society based on Dr. Allama Mohammad Iqbal's and Mohammad Ali Jinnah's vision of Islamic democratic culture providing social security, welfare and the rule of law.

Dr. Allama Mohammad Iqbal's work has influenced Syed Mohsin Raza Gillani in his deliberations on an "Islamic social state".

The organization manifesto includes a desire to provide credible leadership, to restore Pakistan's Khilafat and economic sovereignty, to establish a strong system of accountability and to combat corruption.

References

Student organisations in Pakistan